The 9/11 Living Memorial Plaza is a cenotaph located on a hill in Arazim Valley of Ramot, Jerusalem.

Monument 

The cenotaph measures 30 feet and is made of granite, bronze and aluminum. It takes the form of an American flag, waving and transforming into a flame at the tip. A piece of melted metal from the ruins of the Twin Towers forms part of the base on which the monument rests. A glass pane over the metal facilitates viewing. The names of the victims, including five Israeli citizens, are embedded on the metal plate and placed on the circular wall. The monument is strategically located within view of Jerusalem's main cemetery, Har HaMenuchot.

The folded part of the flag is reminiscent of the collapse of the towers in a cloud of dust. The flag morphs into a six-meter high memorial flame representative of a torch. It is the first and only monument outside of the United States which lists the names of the nearly 3,000 victims of the 9/11 attacks.

The cenotaph was designed by award-winning artist Eliezer Weishoff. It was commissioned by the Jewish National Fund (JNF/KKL) at a cost of ₪ 10 million ($2 million). The inauguration ceremony was held on 12 November 2009 with representation from the US Ambassador to Israel, James B. Cunningham, members of the Israeli Cabinet and legislature, family of victims and others.

Anniversary commemoration 
The 2013 memorial for the 9/11 attacks was commemorated at Living Memorial Plaza. Families of victims and diplomats attended the event. U.S. Ambassador to Israel Daniel B. Shapiro commented during the ceremony: "Here, at this painfully beautiful memorial site, we are a reminder to everyone that we, Americans and Israelis, stand together in a spirit of solidarity and commitment to the future."

Popular culture 
Israel has issued postage stamps with the 9/11 Living Memorial Plaza pictured, as a tribute to the World Trade Center victims. Also, Israel Coins and Medals Corp issues medal for 9/11 victims with the image of Living Memorial.

Additional memorials
Following the 2018 Pittsburgh synagogue shooting, the Jewish National Fund and JNF-USA erected a stone plaque listing the names of the 11 victims of that attack next to the 9/11 Living Memorial Plaza. In February 2019, Pittsburgh mayor Bill Peduto visited the synagogue memorial and planted an olive tree beside it "as a symbol of peace and continuity".

Gallery

See also 
Memorials and services for the September 11 attacks
Casualties of the September 11 attacks

References

External links 

Monument to victims in the heart of Arazim Valley
Presentation of Living Memorial
Commemoration Ceremony for 9/11 Victims at the Living Memorial near Jerusalem
9/11 "Living Memorial" in the Jerusalem Forest Hills Dedicated @ Youtube

Memorials for the September 11 attacks
2009 sculptures
Buildings and structures in Jerusalem